Lokša or lokše ( and  respectively; may be written in English as loksha or lokshe) is a type of potato pancake like flatbread, popular in the cuisine of western Slovakia and South Moravian Region of the Czech Republic. In South Moravia, lokše is also a term for wide noodles added to soups.

Name
Lokšas are also regionally known as lata, přesňák, šumpál or patenta in the Czech Republic, and lokeš or lokoš in Slovakia.

Preparation 
Lokšas are made from boiled unpeeled potatoes, which are later peeled, grated, and mixed with flour and salt. The dough is made and rolled out into the thin pancakes, which are baked dry on a hot plate. In Slovakia, the salty variant is more popular, where the finished pancakes are spread with lard (preferably goose), and tasted to the soup, or filled with sauerkraut or minced meat. Goose curls are especially famous for Slovenský Grob. The Moravians traditionally prepare sweet lokšes, which are smeared with jam, rolled up like pancakes and sprinkled with poppy seeds, and sugar, sometimes also poured over melted butter.

See also 
 Flatbread
 Pancake
 Tortilla

References

Further reading

External links 
 Lokšas with goose liver (in Slovak)
 Slovácko patentas (in Czech)

Flatbreads
Pancakes
Slovak cuisine
Czech cuisine